Robert Skotak (born May 17, 1945) is an American filmmaker and visual effects artist, known for his collaborations with director James Cameron. He won two Academy Awards for Best Visual Effects, for Aliens (1986) and Terminator 2: Judgment Day (1991), in addition to two BAFTA Awards and a Saturn Award. He is one the founders of the effects studios 4-Ward Productions and Whodoo EFX.

Filmography

As visual effects supervisor

References

External links 
 
 Red Fantasies by Robert Skotak
 Robert Skotak
 Terminator
 Robert Skotak who won an Oscar for best visual effects on Terminator 2

1945 births
Living people
Best Visual Effects Academy Award winners
Best Visual Effects BAFTA Award winners